André de Montalembert (1483–1553), Seigneur d'Essé, was a French nobleman and officer of the 16th century. As a young boy he fought in the Italian Wars. He was chosen by Francis I as one of his three brothers-in-arms in 1520 at the Field of the Cloth of Gold tournaments with Henry VIII of England. 

In 1542, André de Montalembert was sent to Constantinople to ascertain the Ottoman offensive within the context of the Franco-Ottoman alliance, but it turned out that Suleiman, partly under the anti-alliance influence of Suleyman Pasha, was unwilling to send an army that year, and promised to send an army twice as strong the following year, in 1543.

In 1548, he was sent at the head of 6,000 men into Scotland to support Regent Arran against England in the war known as the Rough Wooing. There he became well known, usually as d'Essé, Lieutenant-General of the Army and Navy. D'Essé spoke at the parliament at Haddington on 7 July 1548, proposing the marriage of Mary, Queen of Scots to the Dauphin, and d'Oysel as French ambassador accepted the unanimous approval. Haddington was occupied and fortified by the English and d'Esse laid siege. In October 1548 he suffered a reverse with a failed night attack on the town. He was relieved at Haddington by Paul de la Barthe, sieur de Termes. A notable success for d'Esse was his capture of Inchkeith on 20 June 1549. He returned to Paris in triumph with seven captured English banners in July and presented them to Henry II of France. For his service in Scotland, d'Essé was made a knight of the Order of St Michael.

He died at the siege of Therouanne in 1553.

Notes

References
 Garnier, Edith L'Alliance Impie Editions du Felin, 2008, Paris  Interview

French soldiers
1483 births
1553 deaths
Sieges involving England
Sieges involving Scotland
Sieges involving France
16th century in Scotland
French people of the Rough Wooing